Euan Baillie East (born 5 July 2000) is a Scottish professional footballer who plays as a centre back for Queen of the South, having previously played for Queen's Park and Albion Rovers as a striker.

Club career

Queen's Park 
East started his senior career at Queen's Park, where he was primarily used as a substitute, scoring one goal in the 2018–19 season.

Albion Rovers 
On 11 July 2019, East signed for Albion Rovers. East scored seven league goals during his solitary season for the Coatbridge club. At the end of that season, East rejected a contract offer from the Wee Rovers, instead preferring to chase a full-time contract elsewhere.

Queen of the South 
On 25 September 2020, East signed a full-time contract with Queen of the South before the start of the 2020–21 season. On 17 October 2020, East's league debut for the Doonhamers was in a 2–1 defeat versus Ayr United at Somerset Park. East had already played in two Betfred League Cup matches versus Greenock Morton and St Mirren earlier in October 2020.

On 10 November 2020, East scored his first goal for the Doonhamers versus Queen's Park, his first club, at Hampden Park in a 3-1 victory in the League Cup.

On 9 June 2021, East signed a one-year extension to his contract to remain at the Doonhamers for the 2021-22 season, where he has reverted from playing as a striker to a centre back.

On 8 April 2022, East was the captain versus Partick Thistle at Palmerston in a 1-0 defeat, in the absence of club captain Josh Todd due to injury.

On 16 April 2022, East once again captain versus Arbroath at Gayfield in a 5-1 defeat.

On 19 April 2022, East scored the winning goal in the 40th minute, as Queens won 2-1 versus Inverness Caledonian Thistle at Palmerston.

On 23 April 2022, East scored for Queens in the 80th minute, then scored an own goal in the 87th minute versus Ayr United in a 1-1 draw at Palmerston, that ultimately relegated the Doonhamers to League One.

On 15 June 2022, East signed a one-year extension to his existing contract to remain with the Doonhamers.

References 

Scottish footballers
2000 births
Living people
Queen of the South F.C. players
Scottish Professional Football League players
Association football forwards
Queen's Park F.C. players
Albion Rovers F.C. players
St Mirren F.C. players